The 2019 Supercoppa Italiana (branded as the Coca-Cola Supercup for sponsorship reasons) was the 32nd edition of the Supercoppa Italiana, the Italian football super cup. It was played on 22 December 2019 by defending champions Juventus, the winners of the 2018–19 Serie A championship, and Lazio, the winners of the 2018–19 Coppa Italia. The match was held at the King Saud University Stadium in Riyadh, Saudi Arabia. Lazio won the match 3–1 and claimed their fifth Supercoppa title.

Background
The match was the fifth meeting between the two teams in the Supercoppa Italiana, and is now the most frequent pairing in the history of the competition, surpassing Inter Milan and Roma who have met four times. In the previous four match-ups, each club had won twice, with Juventus lifting the trophy in 2013 and 2015, and Lazio in 1998 and 2017.

Match

Details

{| width="100%"
|valign="top" width="40%"|

See also

 2018–19 Serie A
 2018–19 Coppa Italia

References 

2019
Juventus F.C. matches
S.S. Lazio matches
2019–20 in Italian football cups
Sports competitions in Saudi Arabia